The Norwegian Elkhound is one of the Northern Spitz-type breeds of dog and is the National Dog of Norway. The Elkhound has served as a hunter, guardian, herder, and defender. It is known for its courage in tracking and hunting elk and other large game, such as bears or wolves. The Norwegian Elkhound was first presented at a dog exhibition in Norway in 1877.

The AKC breed name "Norwegian Elkhound" is a mistranslation from its original Norwegian name , meaning "Norwegian moose dog". In Norwegian "elg" means "moose" and "hund" means "dog," as it does in many other Germanic languages. It is Spitz breed, not a "hound" dog. The breed's object in the hunt is to independently track down and hold the moose at bay—jumping in and out toward the moose, distracting its attention, while signaling to the hunters by barking very loudly—until the hunter who follows the sound can arrive to shoot it. The dog will only bark while the moose is stationary, but it can also slowly drive the moose towards shooters lying in wait. The Norwegian Elkhound is also used on a leash. In this mode of hunting, the dog leads the hunter in the direction of the moose while keeping quiet.

Lineage
The breed falls under the mitochondrial DNA sub-clade referred to as d1 that is only found in northern Scandinavia. It is the result of a female wolf-male dog hybridization that occurred post-domestication. Subclade d1 originated 4,800–3,000 years ago and includes all Sami-related breeds: Finnish Lapphund, Swedish Lapphund, Lapponian Herder, Jämthund, Norwegian Elkhound and Hällefors Elkhound. The maternal wolf sequence that contributed to these breeds has not been matched across EurasiaDescription

Appearance

Its grey, white, and black coat is made up of two layers: an underlying dense smooth coat ranging from black at the muzzle, ears, and tip of its tail to silvery grey on its legs, tail, and underbody and an overlying black-tipped protective guard coat. An ideal Elkhound has a tightly curled tail. The Elkhound is a medium-sized dog and extremely hardy.

Temperament

Norwegian Elkhounds are bred for hunting large game, such as wolf, bear and moose. Although the breed is strong and hardy, the dogs typically have an inseparable bond with their masters and are quite loyal. All Elkhounds have a sharp loud bark which makes them suitable as watchdogs.

Norwegian Elkhounds are loyal to their "pack" and make excellent family dogs given proper attention. They are bold, playful, independent, alert, extremely intelligent, and, at times, a bit boisterous. They rank 54th in Stanley Coren's The Intelligence of Dogs, being of above average working/obedience intelligence.

Health
Norwegian Elkhounds sometimes carry a genetic predisposition to suffer from progressive retinal atrophy, or, like many medium and large breeds, hip dysplasia, renal problems, and cysts, particularly in later life; they are also prone to thyroid problems. Overall, however, they are a hardy breed with few health problems.

Elkhounds are prone to rapid weight gain and must not be overfed.

They have a lifespan of 12–16 years. There have been reports of elkhounds living to be 18 years old and older.

History
It was officially recognized by The Kennel Club in 1901.

Famous Norwegian Elkhounds
President Herbert Hoover's "Weegie"

See also
 Dogs portal
 List of dog breeds
 Tahltan Bear Dog (extinct)
 Norwegian Lundehund
 Old Norwegian sheep
 Icelandic goat
 Norwegian sheep landrace
 Norwegian chicken landrace
 Norwegian forest cat

References
Citations

Bibliography
 Lynch, Deborah and Jenny Madeoy. 2004 "Man's best research guide: Breeds hold key to shared ailments." presented at the annual meeting of the American Association for the Advancement of Science by Deborah Lynch of the Canine Studies Institute in Aurora, Ohio and Jenny Madeoy of the Fred Hutchinson Cancer Centre in Seattle. 
 Lynch, Deborah and Jenny Madeoy. 2004a "How top dogs took lead 7,000 years ago." presented at the annual meeting of the American Association for the Advancement of Science conference in Seattle by Deborah Lynch of the Canine Studies Institute in Aurora, Ohio and Jenny Madeoy of the Fred Hutchinson Cancer Centre in Seattle. 

Further reading
Books
Norwegian Elkhound (Comprehensive Owner's Guide), 2005. 
Norwegian Elkhounds by Anna Katherine Nicholas. TFH, 1997. 
The Norwegian Elkhound (Pure Bred) by Nina P. Ross, PhD. Doral, 1995. 
The Elkhound in the British Isles by Anne Roslin-Williams. Witherby & Co., 1993. 
My 60 Years with Norwegian Elkhounds by Olav P. Campbell, 1988.
The New Complete Norwegian Elkhound, revised edition, by Olav Wallo. Howell, 1987.
Norwegian Elkhounds by Anna Katherine Nicholas. TFH, 1983.
Great Gray Dogs: The Norwegian Elkhound Factbook, 2nd edition. Great Gray Dogs, 1980.
Your Norwegian Elkhound by Helen E. Franciose and Nancy C. Swanson. Denlinger, 1974.
How to Raise and Train a Norwegian Elkhound by Glenna Clark Crafts. TFH, 1973. Reprint of the 1964 book with a different cover.
Magazine Articles
Dearth, Kim D.R. "The Norwegian Elkhound" Dog World September 1999, Vol. 84 Issue 9, p12-17.
"Dog of the Vikings" Dog Fancy. April 1998.
"Norwegian Elkhound". Dog World''. July 1997, Vol. 82 Issue 7. p86.
"Regional occurrence, high frequency but low diversity of mitochondrial DNA haplogroup d1 suggests a recent dog-wolf hybridization in Scandinavia". Klütsch CFC, Seppälä EH, Lohi H, Fall T, Hedhammar Å, Uhlén M, Savolainen P 2010 Animal Genetics, online early.

External links
 Norwegian Elkhound Association of America
 Norwegian Elkhound Club of Great Britain

FCI breeds
Scent hounds
Spitz breeds
Dog breeds originating in Norway